Soerjani Mingoen (née Karijomenawi) is a Surinamese politician.  She has been a member of the National Assembly since 2020, representing Commewijne District for the Progressive Reform Party (VHP).

Biography
Mingoen is of Javanese descent. She was a co-founder of the Music Education Center Commewijne (MECC) in 2010.

Mingoen was originally a supporter of the Javanese party Pertjajah Luhur (PL). She was disappointed in this party when, against previous promises, it joined the first Cabinet (2010-2015) of President Desi Bouterse.  She also opposed the PL's support of the Amnesty Law (2012), which prevented prosecution of the December murders.  According to her, the PL had deceived the Javanese community.

Mingoen followed the developments of the Progressive Reform Party (VHP) under the chairmanship of Chan Santokhi.  As she found herself agreeing with Santokhi's positions, she eventually joined the VHP in 2018.  In December 2019, she and VHP youth members traveled to Richelieu and Meerzorg for Christmas carol singing with keyboard and saxophone accompaniment.

During the general elections in 2020, Mingoen was a candidate on the VHP list in Commewijne District.  She was elected to the National Assembly.

References

External links
 National Assembly profile

Living people
People from Commewijne District
Surinamese educators
Surinamese women in politics
Surinamese people of Javanese descent
Progressive Reform Party (Suriname) politicians
Members of the National Assembly (Suriname)
Year of birth missing (living people)